Luke Stewart is a composer-improviser, bassist, multi-instrumentalist, and organizer known for his work as a soloist; leader of his Exposure Quintet, with Edward Wilkerson, Jr., Ken Vandermark, Jim Baker, and Avreeayl Ra; and member of groups including Blacks' Myths, Heart of the Ghost, Six Six, Irreversible Entanglements, and Heroes Are Gang Leaders, a literary free jazz ensemble that was awarded the 2018 American Book Award for Oral Literature.

Stewart has co-run DC jazz advocacy nonprofit CapitalBop since 2010, curating the organization's longstanding "Loft Jazz" concert series and writing music criticism for its website. In 2020, he was included among DownBeat's "25 for the Future" as an artist who "shapes the artistic landscape".

He has performed or recorded with artists including Camae Ayewa, Keir Neuringer, Aquiles Navarro, Tcheser Holmes, Archie Shepp, Warren "Trae" Crudup, III, Miriam Parker, Daniel Carter, Fay Victor, Hamiet Bluiett, Wadada Leo Smith, Jarrett Gilgore, Ian McColm, Anthony Pirog, Jaimie Branch, Thurston Moore, Leila Bordreuil, and Priests.

Early life and career 

Stewart grew up in Ocean Springs, Mississippi, where he studied saxophone, violin, and guitar before he began playing electric bass in high school. Stewart began his undergraduate degree as an international studies major at the University of Mississippi. In 2005, as he prepared to begin an internship at the National Coalition to Abolish the Death Penalty in Washington, D.C., Hurricane Katrina hit the Mississippi Gulf Coast. Stewart decided to stay in D.C. and transferred to American University, where his studies expanded to include audio engineering. In addition to his bachelor's from American, Stewart completed a master's in Arts Management and Entrepreneurship at The New School in 2019.

After moving to D.C., Stewart began frequently attending and performing at avant-garde jazz and rock gigs. He also interned at "Jazz and Justice" radio station WPFW, eventually hosting his own weekly jazz radio show and working as a production coordinator.

In 2010, Stewart met Giovanni Russonello, who had recently founded jazz advocacy organization and website CapitalBop. Stewart began writing for and then co-running the organization, which was awarded a $100,000 grant from the Doris Duke Charitable Foundation in 2019.

Stewart met Camae Ayewa (also known as Moor Mother) while playing with Laughing Man, an art-punk band that shared bills with Ayewa's group the Mighty Paradocs. One year after the 2014 "People Issue" of the Washington City Paper called Stewart a "jazz revolutionary", he joined Ayewa, Keir Neuringer, Aquiles Navarro, and Tcheser Holmes in forming the "liberation-oriented free-jazz collective" Irreversible Entanglements. The group performed in the inaugural season of the Kennedy Center's "Direct Current" contemporary culture showcase, and their releases have been included in best-of lists in Magnet, NPR Music, The Quietus, and Stereogum's "20 Best Jazz Albums Of The 2010s".

Stewart has said he wants his collaborative work to "highlight the non-hierarchical nature of free improvisational music" and to challenge "the concept of the capital-C composer and how it affects our perceptions of music".

He is a 2021 Resident Composer at Pioneer Works in Brooklyn.

Discography

As leader / co-leader

As sideperson

References 

21st-century American composers
African-American composers
African-American male composers
American experimental musicians
Avant-garde jazz musicians
Jazz musicians from Mississippi
Living people
Year of birth missing (living people)
21st-century American male musicians
21st-century African-American musicians